Roberto De Vicenzo (14 April 1923 – 1 June 2017) was a professional golfer from Argentina. He won a record 229 professional tournaments worldwide during his career, including seven on the PGA Tour and most famously the 1967 Open Championship. He is perhaps best remembered for signing an incorrect scorecard that kept him out of a playoff for the 1968 Masters Tournament.

Biography
De Vicenzo was born on 14 April 1923 in Villa Ballester, a northern suburb of Buenos Aires, Argentina. He was raised in the Villa Pueyrredón neighborhood of Buenos Aires, and acquired the game of golf as a caddie. He developed his skills at the Ranelagh Golf Club, and later relocated to the town of the same name.

De Vicenzo won his first Argentine tournament, the Abierto del Litoral, in 1942; his first World Cup in 1953; and a major tournament, The Open Championship, in 1967. De Vicenzo is best remembered for his misfortune in the 1968 Masters Tournament. On the par-4 17th hole, Roberto De Vicenzo made a birdie, but playing partner Tommy Aaron inadvertently entered a 4 instead of 3 on the scorecard. He did not check the scorecard for the error before signing it, and according to the Rules of Golf the higher score had to stand and be counted. If not for this mistake, De Vicenzo would have tied for first place with Bob Goalby, and the two would have met in an 18-hole playoff the next day. His quote afterwards became legendary for its poignancy: "What a stupid I am!"

In 1970 he was voted the Bob Jones Award, the highest honor given by the United States Golf Association in recognition of distinguished sportsmanship in golf.

De Vicenzo subsequently found great success in the early days of the Senior PGA Tour, winning the Liberty Mutual Legends of Golf two times and the inaugural U.S. Senior Open in 1980. He also won the 1974 PGA Seniors' Championship, and represented Argentina 15 times in the Canada Cup/World Cup, leading Argentina to victory in 1953.

De Vicenzo was inducted into the World Golf Hall of Fame in 1989, and officially retired on 12 November 2006, at age 83 with over 200 international victories. The Museum of Golf in Argentina in Berazategui was founded because of his hard work. It was named in his honor upon its completion in 2006.

De Vicenzo died 1 June 2017 at the age of 94.

Books about his life
There are two books on the life of Roberto De Vicenzo, with similar names. The first of them is called "Roberto De Vicenzo. Gentleman, Sportsman, Winner", made by Luis Melnik, and the second has the title "Roberto De Vicenzo. Gentleman, Sportsman, Winner. Premium Edition", which was written by journalist Daniel Mancini, work that includes the definitive statistics of De Vicenzo's career together with Roberto's vision of each of his sporting experiences, plus the description of the great players he faced, the details of his beginnings, the specific references to his triumph at the British Open and what happened at the Masters in Augusta, a significant event that identifies all the protagonists of that historic outcome.

Professional wins (229)

PGA Tour wins (7)

European circuit wins (9)
1948 (1) North British-Harrogate Tournament
1950 (3) Dutch Open, Belgian Open, Open de France
1960 (1) Open de France
1964 (2) Open de France, German Open
1966 (1) Spanish Open
1967 (1) The Open Championship

Argentine Tour wins (132)
this list is incomplete
1942 (1) Abierto del Litoral
1943 (2) Center Open, Westinhouse Grand Prix
1944 (3) Argentine PGA Championship, Argentine Open, Cirio Grand Prix
1945 (3) Argentine PGA Championship, Cirio Grand Prix, Bahía Blanca Open
1946 (5) Palermo Grand Prix, Abierto del Litoral, South Open, La Plata Open, Masllorens Grand Prix
1947 (10) Argentine PGA Championship, Abierto del Litoral, South Open, Cirio Grand Prix, Ranelagh Open, Masllorens Grand Prix, Alvear Grand Prix, San Isidro Open, Mailly Grand Prix, America Cup
1948 (5) Argentine PGA Championship, Cirio Grand Prix, Masllorens Grand Prix, Ranelagh Open, La Plata Open
1949 (6) Argentine PGA Championship, Argentine Open, Abierto del Litoral, Ituzaingo Grand Prix, Masllorens Grand Prix, San Isidro Open
1950 (4) Masllorens Grand Prix, Ituzaingo Grand Prix, San Isidro Open, San Martin Grand Prix
1951 (5) Argentine PGA Championship, Argentine Open, Msllorens Grand Prix, Alvear Grand Prix, San Isidro Open
1952 (2) Argentine Open, San Isidro Open
1953 (1) Argentino Grand Prix
1954 (2) Alvear Grand Prix, San Martin Grand Prix
1958 (1) Argentine Open
1960 (3) Argentine PGA Championship, Charles of the Ritz Grand Prix, Siam Grand Prix
1961 (1) Ranelagh Open
1962 (6) Argentine Masters, North Open, Center Open, South Open, Branca Grand Prix, Suixtill Grand Prix
1963 (2) Branca Grand Prix, Tortugas Grand Prix
1964 (4) Argentine Masters, Argentine PGA Championship, Minerva Grand Prix, Jockey Club Rosario Open
1965 (6) Argentine PGA Championship, Argentine Open, Center Open, Rio Cuarto Open, Acantilados Grand Prix, Jockey Club Rosario Open
1966 (4) Argentine Masters, Argentine PGA Championship, North Open, Ranser Grand Prix
1967 (6) Argentine Open, Center Open, South Open, Ranelagh Open, Ranser Grand Prix, Pindapoy Grand Prix
1968 (4) Abierto del Litoral, Ranelagh Open, Acantilados Grand Prix, Peugeot Grand Prix
1969 (6) Argentine PGA Championship, Norpatagonico Open, Ranelagh Open, Glustora Grand Prix, Lomas Open, Kanmar Grand Prix
1970 (4) Argentine Open, Argentine Masters, Ranelagh Open, Old Smuggler Grand Prix
1971 (5) Argentine PGA Championship, Acantilados Grand Prix, La Cumbre Open, Pinamar Open, Santa Teresita Open
1972 (5) Argentine PGA Championship, Center Open, South Open, Ranelagh Open, Acantilados Grand Prix
1973 (4) Center Open, South Open, North Open, Lomas Open
1974 (8) Argentine PGA Championship, Argentine Masters, Argentine Open, Center Open, North Open, San Martin Grand Prix, Charles of the Ritz Grand Prix, Los Lagartos Grand Prix
1975 (2) Jockey Club Rosario Open, Charles of the Ritz Grand Prix
1976 (2) Velox Grand Prix, Metropolitano Open
1977 (3) Argentine PGA Championship, South Open, Velox Grand Prix
1978 South Open, San Martin Grand Prix, Sidesa Grand Prix
1979 (3) Acantilados Grand Prix, Sidesa Grand Prix
1983 (1) North Open
1985 (1) Argentine PGA Championship

Latin America/Caribbean wins (60)
this list may be incomplete
1946 Chile Open (tie with Enrique Bertolino), Viña del Mar Open (Chile)
1947 Cali Open (Colombia)
1948 Uruguay Open
1949 Uruguay Open
1951 Cali Open (Colombia), Bogota Open (Colombia), Barranquilla Open (Colombia), Mexican Open
1952 Panama Open, Santo Domingo Open (Chile)
1953 Panama Open, Mexican Open, Peru Open
1954 Brazil Open, Peru Open, Barranquilla Open (Colombia) Bogota Open (Colombia)
1955 Mexican Open, PGA of Mexico, Medellin Open (Colombia)
1956 Jamaica Open, Barranquilla Open (Colombia), Bogota Open (Colombia), PGA of Mexico
1957 Brazil Open, Jamaica Open
1958 Peru Open, Medellin Open (Colombia), PGA of Mexico
1959 PGA of Mexico
1960 Brazil Open, Barranquilla Open (Colombia), Bogota Open (Colombia)
1961 Chile Open, Colombian Open, Barranquilla Open (Colombia)
1962 Barranquilla Open (Colombia)
1963 Brazil Open
1964 Brazil Open, Uruguay Open, Bogota Open (Colombia)
1965 Los Lagartos Open
1966 Los Lagartos Open
1968 Los Lagartos Open
1969 PGA of Mexico, Los Lagartos Open
1970 Itanhanga Open (Brazil)
1971 Panama Open
1972 Caracas Open, San Pablo Open (Brazil), Rio Grande Open (Brazil)
1973 Panama Open, Caracas Open, Brazil Open
1974 Panama Open, Raleigh Cup (Mexico)
1978 Santiago Open (Chile)
1979 Santo Tome Open, Oro Negro Open (Venezuela)

Other wins (3)

Senior PGA Tour wins (2)

Senior PGA Tour playoff record (0–1)

Other senior wins (16)
this list may be incomplete
1974 PGA Seniors' Championship, World Senior Championship
1979 Liberty Mutual Legends of Golf (with Julius Boros)
1983 Liberty Mutual Legends of Golf (with Rod Funseth), Doug Sanders Classic
1986 Conmmemorative Pro-Am (Super Senior)
1987 Argentine Senior Open, Pontevedra Classic (Super Senior), Digital Classic (Super Senior)
1988 Liberty Mutual Legends of Golf - Legendary Division (with Charlie Sifford), Vintage Championship Invitational (Super Senior), Pages Classic (Super Senior)
1989 Liberty Mutual Legends of Golf - Legendary Division (with Charlie Sifford), Vantage Championship (Super Senior)
1991 Liberty Mutual Legends of Golf - Legendary Division (with Charlie Sifford)
1992 Center Senior Argentine Open

Major championships

Wins (1)

Results timeline

CUT = missed the half-way cut
R16, QF, SF = Round in which player lost in PGA Championship match play
"T" = tied

Summary

Most consecutive cuts made – 14 (1948 Open Championship – 1957 Open Championship)
Longest streak of top-10s – 3 (twice)

Champions Tour major championships

Wins (1)

Team appearances
World Cup (representing Argentina): 1953 (winners), 1954, 1955, 1962 (individual winner), 1963, 1964, 1965, 1966, 1968, 1969, 1970 (individual winner), 1971, 1972, 1973, 1974
World Cup (representing Mexico): 1956, 1959, 1960, 1961

References

External links

Argentine male golfers
PGA Tour golfers
PGA Tour Champions golfers
Winners of men's major golf championships
Winners of senior major golf championships
World Golf Hall of Fame inductees
Argentine people of Italian descent
People from San Martín, Buenos Aires
Sportspeople from Buenos Aires Province
1923 births
2017 deaths